Agdistis olei is a moth in the family Pterophoridae. It is known from Iran, Oman, Bahrain, Saudi Arabia and the United Arab Emirates.

References

Agdistinae
Moths of the Arabian Peninsula
Moths described in 1976